Al-Bitariyah  is a Syrian village located in Douma District, Rif Dimashq. According to the Syria Central Bureau of Statistics (CBS), Al-Bitariyah had a population of 3,026 in the 2004 census.

References 

Populated places in Douma District